The statue of Albrecht von Roon is an outdoor 1904 monument to Albrecht von Roon by Harro Magnusson, installed in Tiergarten in Berlin, Germany.

References

External links

 

1904 establishments in Germany
1904 sculptures
Statues in Berlin
Outdoor sculptures in Berlin
Statues in Germany
Sculptures of men in Germany
Tiergarten (park)